Dawn is a 1928 British silent war film directed by Herbert Wilcox and starring Sybil Thorndike, Gordon Craig, and Marie Ault. It was produced by Wilcox for his British & Dominions Film Corporation. The film was made at Cricklewood Studios with sets designed by Clifford Pember.

Based on a play by Reginald Berkeley, this film tells the story of World War I martyr Edith Cavell. Sybil Thorndike stars as Cavell, a nurse who risked her own life by rescuing British Prisoners of War from the Germans. When Cavell was captured and sentenced to be executed, it sparked international outrage, even from neutral nations.

Production
Herbert Wilcox had just made Mumsie (1927), starring Pauline Frederick. Wilcox wanted to make another film with Frederick and suggested Noël Coward's The Vortex but Frederick disliked the role. Wilcox then saw the statue of Edith Cavell in London and decided to make a film of her life.

Frederick was enthusiastic at first but dropped out. Some claimed it was because  there was an outcry at the thought of an American playing Cavell. Wilcox claims Frederick was scared off after the German ambassador said that Germany would boycott her films. She was replaced with Sybil Thorndike. Filming proved difficult.

Censorship
One of the most controversial British films of the 1920s, Dawn was censored because of what objectors considered its brutal depiction of warfare and anti-German sentiment. Pressure was exerted by both the German Ambassador and the British Foreign Secretary Austen Chamberlain to prevent the film being passed for exhibition.

Edith Cavell's sister criticised the film saying it would promote hate. However, George Bernard Shaw praised the film. When eventually released, the film was a big success.

Wilcox returned to the subject in 1939 with Nurse Edith Cavell starring Anna Neagle.

Cast
 Sybil Thorndike – Nurse Edith Cavell 
 Ada Bodart – Herself 
 Gordon Craig – Philippe Bodart 
 Marie Ault – Mme. Rappard 
 Mickey Brantford – Jacques Rappard 
 Mary Brough – Mme. Pitou 
 Richard Worth – Jean Pitou – Bargekeeper 
 Colin Bell – Widow Deveaux 
 Dacia Deane – Mme. Deveaux's Daughter 
 Cecil Barry – Col. Schultz 
 Frank Perfitt – Gen. von Zauberzweig 
 Haddon Mason – German A.P.M. 
 Maurice Braddell – British Airman 
 Edward O'Neill – Lutheran Priest 
 Griffith Humphreys – President of the Court Martial 
 Edward Sorley – German Soldier

References

External links

Bibliography
 Low, Rachael. History of the British Film, 1918–1929. George Allen & Unwin, 1971.

1928 films
1920s war drama films
British war drama films
British silent feature films
British black-and-white films
Films directed by Herbert Wilcox
World War I films based on actual events
Films set in the 1910s
Films set in Belgium
Films shot at Cricklewood Studios
Films about capital punishment
British and Dominions Studios films
1928 drama films
1920s English-language films
1920s British films
Silent war drama films